Badri Ram Jakhar (born 9 September 1952) was a member of the 15th Lok Sabha, the lower house of the Parliament of India, from the Pali constituency.

He is a Congress leader from Bhopalgarh and a businessman based in Jodhpur Rajasthan.

References
 Lok Sabha Members from Rajasthan
 Fifteenth Lok Sabha Members' Home Page

Living people
Rajasthani politicians
India MPs 2009–2014
People from Pali district
1952 births
Lok Sabha members from Rajasthan
People from Jodhpur district
Indian National Congress politicians from Rajasthan